Reto Schmidiger (born 21 April 1992 in Hergiswil) is a Swiss alpine ski racer.

References

External links
Personal website

1992 births
Living people
Swiss male alpine skiers
Sportspeople from Nidwalden
21st-century Swiss people